George Daniel Browne  (1933 – 14 February 1993) was a Liberian Episcopalian bishop.

Birth and education
He was born in Cape Palmas, Liberia, and was educated at Cuttington University, in Suacoco, and later at the Virginia Theological Seminary in the United States.

Ecclesiastical career
Browne was ordained deacon in 1962, and priest in 1963. He became Bishop of the Diocese of Liberia in 1970 and Archbishop of West Africa in 1982, retiring from both posts in 1989.

Death
He died on 14 February 1993 in Milwaukee, United States (the home town of one of his children) after a long struggle with terminal illness and deteriorating health.

References

1933 births
1993 deaths
Liberian Episcopalians
Cuttington University alumni
20th-century Anglican bishops in Africa
20th-century Anglican archbishops
Anglican archbishops of West Africa
Anglican bishops of Liberia